Pandanus columnaris is a dioecious tropical plant in the screwpine genus. It is endemic to Madagascar. The specific epithet, "columnaris", refers to the columnar shape of the crown of the tree. Originally described by S. John as separate species, Pandanus columnaris is now considered a synonym for Pandanus pluriloculatus.

Description
Pandanus columnaris is a columnar tree, up to 20 m tall, with light brown bark and a spiny trunk up to 25 cm in diameter. The crown of the tree is  narrowly cylindric, with spirals of large leaves at the top and with short secondary branchlets below.  The terminal leaves may be more than 2 m long,  and 24 cm wide near the base. The lateral branchlets are thin (2-2.5 cm in diameter) and spiny, with leaves that are shorter (1-1. 2 m long) and narrower (18-22 mm wide) than the terminal leaves. Unlike many species of pandanus, P. columnaris has few to no prop roots.

Flowers and fruit
On male trees, the flowers are made up of yellow spikes and form on the lateral branchlets. Styles and stigmas of female flowers are both 6- 7 mm long. Fruits (drupes) are 20-22 mm long, 10-1 5 mm wide and broadly egg-shaped.

Distribution and habitat
The trees are infrequent in coastal forests. The species was first described in 1961, found along the east coast of Madagascar, in the Antalaha area.

Taxonomy
Pandanus columnaris is a member of the section Acanthostyla. Its closest relative is P. mangokensis Martelli.

References

columnaris